Vandazhi-I  is a village in Palakkad district in the state of Kerala, India. It is administered by Vandazhy gram panchayat, along with Mangalam Dam and Vandazhi-II.

Demographics
 India census, Vandazhi-I had a population of 12,624 with 6,278 males and 6,346 females.

References

Villages in Palakkad district